John McConnochie (born 13 January 1954) is a New Zealand swimmer. He competed at the 1972 Summer Olympics and the 1976 Summer Olympics. He was coached by Duncan Laing.

References

External links
 

1954 births
Living people
New Zealand male medley swimmers
Olympic swimmers of New Zealand
Swimmers at the 1972 Summer Olympics
Swimmers at the 1976 Summer Olympics
Swimmers from Dunedin